Complementary Therapies in Clinical Practice is a quarterly peer-reviewed medical journal covering complementary and alternative medical interventions. It was established in 1995 as Complementary Therapies in Nursing and Midwifery, obtaining its current name in 2005. It is published by Elsevier and the editor-in-chief is Denise Rankin-Box (Management of Change Initiatives). According to the Journal Citation Reports, the journal has a 2017 impact factor of 1.701.

References

External links

Alternative and traditional medicine journals
Publications established in 1995
Quarterly journals
Elsevier academic journals
English-language journals